ZR, Zr, or zr may refer to:

People 

 Lil ZR (short for Zinedine Ricardo) of Sulaymaniyyah, a political figure and gang leader in Iraq, mostly known for his inventions of ASAP Rocky, Benson (Regular Show character), the 14th chromosome, and the Republic of Georgia. His political views were strongly supportive of the Sudanese Revolution  (shoutout OB) and very opposing of the existence of Poland.

Science and technology
 .zr, former Internet country code top-level domain (ccTLD) for Zaire
 Zirconium, symbol Zr, a chemical element
 Zona reticularis, the innermost layer of the adrenal cortex

Airships
 , a 1922 United States Navy rigid airship
 ZR-2, a British/United States Navy rigid airship
 , a 1923–1924 United States Navy rigid airship

Other vehicles 
 Kawasaki ZR-7, a motorcycle
 MG ZR, a car made by the MG Rover Group
 Toyota ZR engine, an automobile engine
 ZR (bus), private taxi-bus in Barbados

Places 
 Zrenjanin, a city in Serbia (license plate code)

Transport 
 Zambia Railways

Other uses
 Aviacon Zitotrans (IATA airline code ZR)
 Zettai ryōiki, a clothing style trend tied to anime and otaku subcultures
 ZR, assistant (with ZL and ZY) of Golden Age superhero the Masked Marvel (Centaur Publications)